Arvind Deshpande (31 May 1932  – 3 January 1987) was an acclaimed Indian film, theatre and television actor and theatre director. Apart from Marathi theatre as well as Hindi theatre in Mumbai, he acted in many mainstream Bollywood as well as art house films as a character actor, apart from TV series and plays.

Birth and Career
He was born in 31 May 1932 in Mumbai.

Deshpande was a leading figure in experimental theatre movement of the 1960s. He was associated with Rangayan, that he co-founded with his wife Sulabha Deshpande and  Vijaya Mehta. In 1971 along with his wife Sulabha Deshpande he co-founded theatre group Awishkar along with its children's wing Chandrashala, which continues to perform professional children theatre. Arvind and Sulabha Deshpande along with playwright Vijay Tendulkar were also at the centre of the Chhabildas Movement in Marathi experimental theatre during the 1960s and 70s.

Personal life
Arvind was married to noted theatre actor-director, Sulabha Deshpande.

Awards
 National Film Award for Best Feature Film in Marathi

Death
He died on 3 January 1987.

Filmography

Films

References

External links
 

Indian male stage actors
Indian male film actors
Male actors in Hindi cinema
1932 births
Male actors from Mumbai
Male actors in Marathi cinema
Male actors in Marathi theatre
Indian male television actors
Indian theatre directors
1987 deaths